Christian Forcellini (born November 10, 1969) is a male former tennis player and sprinter from San Marino.

Forcellini represented his native country in the doubles competition at the 1992 Summer Olympics in Barcelona, Spain, partnering Gabriel Francini. The pair was eliminated in the first round there.

Forcellini played in 6 Davis Cup ties for San Marino from 1993 to 1994, posting an 0–1 record in singles and a 2–4 record in doubles.

He is president of San Marino Tennis Federation and director of San Marino CEPU Open tournament. He was also national golf champion.

He also competed in athletics events as a sprinter, representing his country at the 1996 European Athletics Indoor Championships. He holds the Sammarinese record in the rarely contested 150 metres.

References
ATP Profile
ITF Profile

Sports-Reference Profile

1969 births
Living people
Tennis players at the 1992 Summer Olympics
Olympic tennis players of San Marino
Sammarinese male tennis players
Sammarinese male sprinters